Campodea delamarei is a species of two-pronged bristletail in the family Campodeidae. Delamarei is not the only species of this kind, the best known species is staphylinus because it has a wide distribution across much of Europe.

References

Further reading

 
 
 
 
 
 
 
 

Diplura
Animals described in 1958